Richard Buxton may refer to:
Richard Buxton (botanist) (1786–1865), British botanist
Richard Buxton (judge) (born 1938), former British judge